The jurors of the Eurovision Song Contest 2014 are involved in the voting process. For the semi finals and the final, each country's votes was decided by a combination of 50% televoting by the public and 50% by national jury.

Background
In response to some broadcasters' continued complaints about politically charged, neighbourly and diaspora voting, the European Broadcasting Union (EBU) evaluated the voting procedure used in the contest, and contemplated a change for 2009.  Contest organisers sent a questionnaire regarding the voting system to participating broadcasters, and a reference group incorporated the responses into their suggestions for next year's format. Telewizja Polska (TVP), the Polish broadcaster, suggested that an international jury similar to the one used in the 2008 Eurovision Dance Contest be introduced in the Eurovision Song Contest to lessen the impact of neighbourly voting and place more emphasis on the artistic value of the song. A jury would lead to less political and diaspora voting as the jury members, mandated to be music industry experts, would also have a say in addition to "random members of the public". National juries were originally phased out of the contest beginning in 1997, with televoting becoming mandatory for nearly all participants since 2003.

Jurors
The jurors of the 37 participating countries were as follows:

Georgia jury votes
Georgia's jury votes in the Grand Final were all declared invalid, as all the jury members had voted exactly the same from 3 points up to 12 points. According to EBU, this constitutes a statistical impossibility. Therefore, only Georgia's televoting result was used for the distribution of the Georgian points in the Grand Final.

See also
Eurovision Song Contest 2014
Voting at the Eurovision Song Contest

References

Eurovision Song Contest 2014
Eurovision Song Contest related lists